Tetrafluorohydrazine or perfluorohydrazine, is a colourless, reactive inorganic gas. It is a fluorinated analog of hydrazine. It is a highly hazardous chemical that explodes in the presence of organic materials.

Tetrafluorohydrazine is manufactured from nitrogen trifluoride using an iron catalyst or iron(II) fluoride. It is used in some chemical syntheses, as a precursor or a catalyst.

Tetrafluorohydrazine was considered for use as a high-energy liquid oxidizer in some never-flown rocket fuel formulas in 1959.

Properties 
Tetrafluorohydrazine is in equilibrium with its radical monomer nitrogen difluoride.

 N2F4  2 NF2•

At room temperature N2F4 is mostly associated with only 0.7% in the form of NF2 at 5mm Hg pressure. When the temperature rises to 225 °C, it mostly dissociates with 99% in the form of NF2.

The energy needed to break the N-N bond in N2F4 is 20.8 kcal/mol, with an entropy change of 38.6 eu. For comparison, the dissociation energy of the N-N bond is 14.6 kcal/mol in N2O4, 10.2 kcal/mol in N2O2, and 60 kcal/mol in N2H4. The enthalpy of formation of N2F4 (ΔHf) is 34.421 kJ/mol.

References 

Nitrogen fluorides
Rocket oxidizers
Hydrazines
Gases